Scarlet may refer to:

 Scarlet (cloth), a type of woollen cloth common in medieval England
 Scarlet (color), a bright tone of red that is slightly toward orange, named after the cloth
 Scarlet (dye), the dye used to give the cloth its color
 Scarlet (orca), a southern resident killer whale

Companies and brands
 Scarlet (company), a Belgian telecommunications company
 The Scarlet, a compact, 3K-resolution digital cinema camera from Red Digital Cinema Camera Company

Fictional characters

 Scarlet Overkill, a character in the film Minions
 Captain Scarlet (character), a main character of British children's puppet animation of the same name
 Erza Scarlet, a character from Fairy Tail
 Miss Scarlet, one of six original Clue characters (US spelling)
 Will Scarlet, one of Robin Hood's Merry Men
 Scarlet Benoît, a character in  The Lunar Chronicles book series
 Scarlet Briar, a character in the massively multiplayer online role-playing game Guild Wars 2
 Queen Scarlet of the Skywings, a character from the Wings of Fire book series
 Remilia Scarlet and Flandre Scarlet, characters from the Touhou Project
 Scarlet, a black horse with red highlights from the Horseland television series
 Scarlet O'Donnell, a character in the 2009 American fantasy comedy movie 17 Again

Music
 Scarlet (American band), metalcore band
 Scarlet (British band), UK vocal duo

Albums
 Scarlet (Closterkeller album), 1995
 Scarlet (Code Red album), 1997

Songs
 "Scarlet", a song by Ray Conniff 1963
 "Scarlet" (The Rolling Stones song) 1973
 "Scarlet", a song by October (U2 album) 1981
 "Scarlet", a song by All About Eve 1990
 "Scarlet", a song by Dawnstar 2007
 "Scarlet", a song by Periphery (band) 2012
 "Scarlet", a song by Jars of Clay from the album The Eleventh Hour, 2002

People
Scarlet Page (born 1971), English photographer and the daughter of Led Zeppelin guitarist Jimmy Page and Charlotte Martin
 Scarlet the Southern Belle, a member of the Southern Belles tag-team from the Gorgeous Ladies of Wrestling

Print
 Scarlet (magazine), a British women's magazine
 Scarlet (Icon Comics), a creator-owned comicbook series by Brian Michael Bendis
 Scarlet (novel), a 2013 novel by Marissa Meyer

Other uses
 Scarlet (film)
 Captain Scarlet and the Mysterons, a 1960s British children's puppet animation series
 Scarlet (TV series), a 2019–20 Japanese dorama
 Pokémon Scarlet, one of the two paired Pokémon Scarlet and Violet games for the Nintendo Switch
 Scarlet, Indiana
 Scarlets (formerly the Llanelli Scarlets), a Welsh rugby union team

See also 
 
 Skarlet (Mortal Kombat), a character in the Mortal Kombat series
Scarlett (disambiguation)
Scarlet Knight (disambiguation)
 Scarlet fever, an infectious disease most commonly affecting children
 The Scarlet Hotels, a hotel chain that includes The Scarlet Singapore